"Cigarettes & Cush" is a song by English rapper Stormzy, featuring vocals from American singer and songwriter Kehlani. English singer-songwriter Lily Allen is also heard. It was released as a single on 29 August 2017 as the third single from his debut studio album Gang Signs & Prayer.

Music video
A music video to accompany the release of "Cigarettes & Cush" was first released onto YouTube on 29 August 2017. As of December 2019, the music video has over 1.6 million views.

Charts

Certifications

Release history

References

2017 songs
2017 singles
Stormzy songs
Songs written by Stormzy
Songs written by Fraser T. Smith